The Hartle–Thorne metric is a spacetime metric in general relativity that describes the exterior of a slowly and rigidly rotating, stationary and axially symmetric body. It is an approximate solution of the vacuum Einstein equations.

The metric was found by James Hartle and Kip Thorne in the 1960s to study the spacetime outside neutron stars, white dwarfs and supermassive stars.

Metric
Up to second order in the angular momentum , mass  and quadrupole moment , the
metric in spherical coordinates is given by

where

See also
 Kerr metric

References

General relativity
Metric tensors